Optimus UI is a front-end touch interface developed by LG Electronics with partners, featuring a full touch user interface. It is sometimes incorrectly identified as an operating system. Optimus UI is used internally by LG for sophisticated feature phones and tablet computers, and is not available for licensing by external parties. 

The latest version of Optimus UI, 4.1.2, has been released on the Optimus K II and the Optimus Neo 3. It features a more refined user interface as compared to the previous version, 4.1.1, which would include voice shutter and quick memo. 

Optimus UI is used in devices based on Android.

Phones running LG Optimus UI

Android

Smartphones/Phablets
 LG GT540 Optimus
 LG Optimus One
 LG Optimus 2X
 LG Optimus 4X HD
 LG Optimus 3D
 LG Optimus 3D Max
 LG Optimus Slider
 LG Optimus LTE 
 LG Optimus LTE 2 
 LG Optimus Vu
 LG Optimus Black
 LG Optimus Chat
 LG Optimus Chic
 LG Optimus Net
 LG Optimus Sol
 LG Optimus HUB (E510)
 LG Optimus L3
 LG Optimus L5
 LG Optimus L5 II
 LG Optimus L7
 LG Optimus L9
 LG Optimus L9 II
 LG Optimus L90
 LG Optimus F3
 LG Optimus F3Q
 LG Optimus F5 
 LG Optimus F6
 LG Optimus F7
 LG Optimus G
 LG Optimus G Pro
 LG G2
 LG G Pro 2
 LG Vu 3
 LG G Pro Lite
 LG G Flex
 LG L40 Dual
 LG L65 Dual
 LG L70 Dual
 LG L80 Dual
 LG L90 Dual
 LG G3
 LG G3S
 LG Spectrum 2
 LG G2 Mini
 LG G Flex 2

Tablets
 LG Optimus Pad
 LG Optimus Pad LTE
 LG G Pad 7.0
 LG G Pad 8.3

Windows Phone
 LG Optimus 7
 LG Quantum

References

Mobile operating systems
LG Electronics
Android (operating system) software